"Masterplan" is a song by Australian rock musician, Diesel. It was released as the second single from his second studio album, The Lobbyist (1993), which had peaked at number 1. "Masterplan" peaked at number 42 in Australia in November 1993.

Track listing
 Australian CD Single
 "Masterplan" - 5:19
 "Too Much of a Good Thing" - 4:19

Weekly charts

References

External links

EMI Records singles
1993 singles
1992 songs
Diesel (musician) songs
Songs written by Diesel (musician)